Experiences is the name of the fourth and fifth "best-of" albums by German band X Marks the Pedwalk.

Track listing

Disk one
 "Bloom"
 "Maximum Pace"
 "W.I.T.I.A.K."
 "Missing Light (Re-edit)"
 "Special Sign"
 "Never Look Back (Re-edit)"
 "Desolation"
 "Under Glass"
 "Helpless"
 "Made of Wax"
 "Mirthless Knick-Knack"
 "Ten Miles"
 "The Trap"
 "My Back (Out of Order Mix)"
 "Monomaniac (Mix)"

Disc two
 "Hothead"
 "Sweep Hand"
 "Drawback"
 "Missing Light (World Mix)"
 "Facer"
 "T.O.L."
 "Abattoir (Razormaid Mix)"
 "Cenotaph"
 "Here I Stay"
 "Paranoid Illusions"
 "My Back (Out of Order Mix)"
 "I Promise You a Murder"
 "Danger"
 "Facer (Short Cut)"
 "Arbitrary Execution"

X Marks the Pedwalk albums
2003 compilation albums
Industrial compilation albums